This page lists the results of leadership elections held by the Alberta Liberal Party. Delegated conventions were held until 1988. Elections held since 1994 have been on a One member, one vote basis.

1905 leadership convention

(Held August 3, 1905)
Alexander Cameron Rutherford accl.

Developments, 1905–1924
Alexander Rutherford resigned as Premier on May 26, 1910, and was succeeded by Arthur Sifton. Sifton was appointed by the Lieutendant Governor and it is assumed that Sifton was confirmed as leader at a subsequent convention.

Sifton in turn resigned as premier on October 30, 1917, and Charles Stewart was appointed by the Lieutenant Governor to replace him. It is also assumed that Stewart was confirmed as party leader at a subsequent convention.

After the Stewart government's defeat in the 1921 election and Stewart's resignation as party leader on appointment to the federal cabinet, John R. Boyle was elected by the caucus to replace him on February 2, 1922.

1924 leadership convention

(Held November 27, 1924)
Charles Richmond Mitchell accl.

Jeremiah Heffernan, Andrew Robert McLennan, William Thomas Henry, Stanley Tobin, Joseph Miville Dechene, Hugh John Montgomery, Jesse Gouge, William Ashbury Buchanan, William R. Howson were all nominated as candidates at the convention but immediately withdrew.

1926 leadership convention

(Held April 21, 1926)

Joseph Tweed Shaw accl.

1930 leadership convention

(Held March 27, 1930)

First Ballot:
John W. McDonald 113
William R. Howson 103
John C. Bowen 47
Hugh John Montgomery 22

Second Ballot:
John W. McDonald 138
William R. Howson 109
John C. Bowen 31
Hugh John Montgomery 12

Third Ballot (Montgomery eliminated):
John W. McDonald 158
William R. Howson 117
John C. Bowen 17

1932 leadership convention

(Held October 21, 1932)

William R. Howson accl.

1937 leadership convention

(Held June 4, 1937)

Edward Leslie Gray accl.

Joseph Tweed Shaw, John J. Bowlen, Frederick William Gershaw and two others withdrew. Joseph Miville Dechene was also nominated but was not present at the convention and was declared to be ineligible.

1947 leadership convention

(Held June 25, 1947)

James Harper Prowse elected
Joseph Tremblay
J.M. Wheatley

(Note: The vote totals do not appear to have been released.)

1958 leadership convention

(Held November 1, 1958)

Grant MacEwan 314
Richard Walker 200
Richard Edward Hall eliminated on first ballot

(MacEwan elected on the second ballot.  The vote totals for the first ballot were not released)

1962 leadership convention

(Held January 14, 1962)

Dave Hunter elected
Bryce Stringam

(Note: The vote totals were not announced and Hunter's margin of victory was reported to be "decisive")

1966 leadership convention

(Held January 15, 1966) 

First Ballot:
Adrian Berry 231
Bob Russell 231
Wilbur Freeland 78
Richard Broughton 15

Second Ballot (Broughton eliminated):
Adrian Berry 261
Bob Russell 243
Wilbur Freeland 34

Third Ballot (Freeland eliminated):
Adrian Berry 277
Bob Russell 245

(Berry resigned as Liberal Leader on November 7, 1966, and Michael Maccagno was appointed interim leader on November 14, 1966)

1967 leadership convention

(Held January 28, 1967) 

Michael Maccagno accl.

1969 leadership convention

(Held April 26, 1969) 

First Ballot:
John T. Lowery 284
Don Branigan 194
Bob Russell 171
Trevor Midgley 77

Second Ballot (Midgley eliminated):
John T. Lowery 317
Don Branigan 207
Bob Russell 188

Third Ballot (Russell eliminated):
John T. Lowery 356
Don Branigan 341

1971 leadership convention

(Held March 13, 1971)
Bob Russell 224
Rod Woodcock 51
John Day 30
Arthur Yates 19

1974 leadership convention

(Held March 2, 1974) 
Nicholas Taylor 366
John Borger 293

(Note: There were 78 abstentions)

1988 leadership convention

(Held October 9, 1988)
Laurence Decore 801
Grant Mitchell 385
Nicholas Taylor 259

1994 leadership election

(Held November 13, 1994)

First Ballot:
Grant Mitchell 4,799
Sine Chadi 3,772
Adam Germain 1,663
Gary Dickson 706
Tom Sindlinger 64

Second Ballot (Mitchell, Chadi and Germain move to the next round):

(Note: this ballot used a preferential ballot)
Grant Mitchell 4,121
Sine Chadi 3,587
Adam Germain 1,357

Third Ballot (Germain eliminated and vote distributed):
Grant Mitchell 4,934
Sine Chadi 3,794

1998 leadership election

(Held April 18, 1998)
Nancy MacBeth 4,271
Ken Nicol 2,042
Karen Leibovici 1,038
Linda Sloan 285

2001 leadership election

(Following Nancy MacBeth's personal defeat in the 2001 election, Ken Nicol was appointed interim leader and was acclaimed at the ensuing leadership election)

(Held September 14–15, 2001)
Ken Nicol accl.

2004 leadership election

(Held March 27, 2004)
Kevin Taft 2,354
John Reil 205
Jon Parsons Friel 174

2008 leadership election

(Held December 12, 2008)

David Swann 2,468
Dave Taylor 1,616
Mo Elsalhy 491

2011 leadership election

(Held September 10, 2011)

 Raj Sherman 4,684
 Hugh MacDonald 2,239
 Laurie Blakeman 854
 Bill Harvey 626
 Bruce Payne 197

2017 leadership election

(Held June 4, 2017)

Results

Abstentions: 10

2022 leadership election
On December 8, 2022, then interim leader John Roggeveen was appointed permanent leader of the party after no candidate ran in the leadership election by the initial deadline.

References

Carty, Kenneth R et al. "Leaders and Parties in Canadian Politics : Experiences of the Provinces" Harcourt Brace Jovanovich Canada, 1992
Stewart, David K. and  Archer, Keith  "A Quasi-democracy? : Parties and leadership selection in Alberta" UBC Press, 2000.
Canadian Annual Review 1905

See also
leadership convention
Alberta Liberal Party